Surat West is one of the 182 Legislative Assembly constituencies of Gujarat state in India. It is part of Surat district.

List of segments
This assembly seat represents the following segments,

 Surat City Taluka (Part) – Surat Municipal Corporation (Part) Ward No.-14, 15, 16, 17, 18, 19, 20, 21, 22, 23, 24, 25, 26, 27, 63, 64, 65.

Members of Legislative Assembly
2007: Kishor Vankawala, Bharatiya Janata Party
2012: Kishor Vankawala, Bharatiya Janata Party
2013: Purnesh Modi, Bharatiya Janata Party

Election results

2022

2017

2012

See also
 List of constituencies of Gujarat Legislative Assembly
 Gujarat Legislative Assembly

References

External links
 

Assembly constituencies of Gujarat
Surat
Year of establishment missing